Santa Maria College may refer to:

 Santa Maria College, Melbourne
 Santa Maria College, Perth